McDaniels is a surname. Notable people with the surname include:

Ben McDaniels (born 1980), American football player and coach
Booker McDaniels (1913–1974), American baseball player
Darryl McDaniels (born 1964), American musician
Gene McDaniels (1935–2011), American singer-songwriter
Grace McDaniels (1888–1958), American circus performer
Jackie McDaniels, American poker player
Jaden McDaniels (born 2000), American basketball player
Jalen McDaniels (born 1998), American basketball player
Jim McDaniels (1948-2017), American basketball player
Josh McDaniels (born 1976), American football coach
Pellom McDaniels (born 1968), American football player
Ralph McDaniels, American television personality